Oregon Ballot Measure 100, titled the Wildlife Trafficking Prevention Act, is a ballot measure in the 2016 election in the U.S. state of Oregon. The measure prohibits the purchase, sale, or possession with intent to sell products and parts from specified nonnative wildlife species, specifically elephant, rhinoceros, whale, tiger, lion, leopard, cheetah, jaguar, pangolin, sea turtle, shark, and ray. The ballot measures created several exceptions for activities for law enforcement purposes, activities authorized by federal law, transfers of certain antiques and musical instruments, certain donations for scientific or educational purposes, and non-commercial transfers through gifts or inheritance, and well as for possession by enrolled members of federally recognized tribes. The ballot measure largely banned, among other things, the ivory trade in the state.

Prior to the passage of Measure 100, the only nonnative animal product banned from sale in the state was shark fin. Measure 100 followed the unsuccessful proposal of similar legislation in the Oregon State Legislature in 2015.

The measure was supported by wildlife conservation organizations, such as WildAid, the International Fund for Animal Welfare, Wildlife Conservation Society, National Wildlife Federation, and Association of Zoos and Aquariums. There were no statements in opposition to the measure filed for the state voters' pamphlet.

Measure 100 was broadly approved by Oregon voters with just over sixty-nine percent of them voting in favor, winning the bulk of its support in 24 of the state's 36 counties.

See also
Pangolin trade

References

2016 Oregon ballot measures
Wildlife conservation